Kyan Vaesen (born 13 April 2001) is a Belgian professional footballer who plays as a forward for Belgian First Division A club Westerlo.

Honours 
Westerlo

 Belgian First Division B: 2021–22

References 

2001 births
Living people
Belgian footballers
Association football forwards
K.V.C. Westerlo players
K.V.V. Thes Sport Tessenderlo players
Challenger Pro League players
Belgian National Division 1 players

Belgium youth international footballers